Bridor is a bakery product manufacturing company founded by Louis Le Duff in 1988 and a subsidiary of Groupe Le Duff. The company is based in Brittany near Rennes. 

It operates in France under the brand Bridor de France and in the UK as Bridor UK. It is listed among the Top Players in the Global Fresh Baked Products Market 2018-2025.  In 2018 it introduced a range of smaller 70g sweet-filled croissants to meet demand for reduced portion sizes in the UK.

It is a major supplier to Pret a Manger. Baguettes are prepared in Rennes and frozen for up to a year before being presented as freshly baked in Pret stores.

In 2022 it was forced to abandon its 250 million euro investment project in Ille-et-Vilaine because of environmental opposition.

Operating sites

References

Companies based in Brittany
Bakeries of France